Cosey Fanni Tutti (born Christine Carol Newby; 4 November 1951) is an English performance artist, musician and writer, best known for her time in the avant-garde groups Throbbing Gristle and Chris & Cosey.

Tutti first performed under the name Cosmosis. According to Throbbing Gristle biographer Simon Ford, the name of Cosey Fanni Tutti was suggested to her by mail artist Robin Klassnick based on the title of the opera Così fan tutte, meaning literally "That's What All Women Do."

Early career
Tutti was a performer with COUM Transmissions, of which she was a founding member in 1969. Her addition changed the nature of the group, which had been mostly a musical venture. From that point on, COUM performances became events involving props, costumes, dance, improvisation and street theatre. As an installation artist, she was selected in 1975 to represent Britain at the IXth Biennale de Paris.

Visual art works and performance art 
Tutti worked for two years on the Prostitution project as part of COUM Transmissions, in which she created an exhibition about the pornography and sex industry and worked as a model for sex magazines and films. It was shown at the Institute of Contemporary Arts, London in 1976. Censorship restrictions were imposed on the exhibition so that only one image could be viewed at a time. The project also involved events in which women working in the sex industry and the public could discuss issues about the industry and prostitution. Tutti also utilised her own used tampons and used nappies from Mary Kelly's work. This "aroused hysterical reactions from the British media and art establishment, unable to address the political implications of the work."

Pornography
Tutti had a long career as a stripper and in the fields of pornographic film and magazines stemming from a desire to incorporate her own image into collages that she produced in this period. This willingness to consciously participate in the process of commercial image production has inspired a number of visual and performance artists. Some of her performance artwork has also drawn on her experience as an adult performer. In 1978, she appeared as a dancer in the music video for American singer Sylvester's disco song "You Make Me Feel (Mighty Real)" with three other women from her stripping agency in London, alongside several dancers from Pineapple Dance Studios.

Music career
Music was used in some of Tutti's performance art. The use of music led to Tutti's interest in the concept of "acceptable" music and she went on to explore the use of sound as a means of physical pleasure or pain. In 1976, she cofounded the group Throbbing Gristle with Chris Carter, Peter 'Sleazy' Christopherson and Genesis P-Orridge. The group disbanded in 1981.

Following the breakup of Throbbing Gristle, Genesis P-Orridge and Peter Christopherson went on to form Psychic TV, while Tutti and Chris Carter continued to record together under the moniker Chris & Cosey, with the duo combining their interest and skills in  avant-garde music with the sounds and structures of the then-nascent genres of synthpop and electronic dance music. In honour of the dawn of the 21st century, Chris & Cosey changed their stage name to Carter Tutti, and the project pivoted to focus more on experimental ambient sounds. In 2004, after 23 years apart, all four original members of Throbbing Gristle reunited, and they issued a new 12" recording, TG Now. The band continued to collaborate sporadically and began to perform live shows together for the first time in over two decades. In April 2009, Throbbing Gristle toured the U.S., appearing at the Coachella Valley Music and Arts Festival and playing shows in Los Angeles, New York, San Francisco and Chicago.

In October 2010, Throbbing Gristle began a European tour; however, following the band's first tour date at the London Village Underground venue, London, on 23 October, their website announced that Genesis P-Orridge was no longer willing to perform with the band, and would return to their home in New York. Chris, Cosey and Peter finished the tour without P-Orridge, under the name X-TG. 
 
Carter and Tutti performed with Nik Colk Void of Factory Floor at Mute's Short Circuit Festival on 13 May 2011. A live album of the show, with an additional studio track, was released as Transverse in 2012, under the name Carter Tutti Void.

Later life
Tutti continues to release solo recordings, including a retrospective deluxe box set with many photos and text called Time To Tell, and she continues to work as a performance artist in the Dada tradition. She co-edited (with Richard Birkett) and published (Koenig Books, 2012), Maria Fusco's Cosey Complex, the first major publication to discuss and theorise about Tutti as methodology. In April 2017, she published her autobiography Art Sex Music.

In March 2018, Tutti discussed her life and career with actress Maxine Peake on BBC Radio Four's programme Only Artists.

Discography
Excluding Throbbing Gristle, Carter Tutti or Chris & Cosey releases:
 Time To Tell (1983 Flowmotion)
 Nicki (1983 AQM) [with John Duncan and Chris Carter]
 Electronic Ambient Remixes 4: Selflessness (2004 Conspiracy International)
 Mist While Sleeping (2010 Dirter Promotions) [with Philippe Petit]
 Carter Tutti Void Transverse (2012 Mute)
 Carter Tutti Void f(x) (2015 Industrial Records)
 Carter Tutti Void Triumvirate (2019 Conspiracy International)
Tutti (2019 Conspiracy International)

Videos
 A Study In Scarlet (1986 Conspiracy International)

Books
 Art Sex Music (6 Apr 2017, Faber & Faber)
 Re-Sisters (2022)

Radio 
Tutti took part in BBC Radio 4 Only Artists broadcast on 28 March 2018.

References

External links
 Cosey Fanni Tutti's homepage
 Official CARTER TUTTI site
 Interview on Time to Tell, about her experience in the sex industry
 Cosey Fanni Tutti at the Tate Triennial 2006
 Cosey Fanni Tutti & Genesis P-Orridge in 1976 - Media frenzy, Prostitution-style / Excerpts from John A. Walker's Art and Outrage about the exhibition at the Institute of Contemporary Arts, London (1976).

1951 births
Artists from Kingston upon Hull
British industrial musicians
English women guitarists
English rock guitarists
Living people
British sound artists
Women sound artists
British erotic dancers
English women in electronic music
Throbbing Gristle members
20th-century English women musicians
21st-century English women musicians